Pointe-du-Lac is one of the six boroughs of the city of Trois-Rivières and a former municipality in Quebec, Canada on the St. Lawrence River. It was founded in 1738 and its current church dates from 1882. Another old building in the village is the Moulin Seigneurial, founded in 1721 and rescued in the 70s by resident Mariette Chenay.

The municipality was amalgamated into the City of Trois-Rivières in 2002. Population (2001 census) 6,902.

Populated places established in 1738
Populated places disestablished in 2002
Neighbourhoods in Trois-Rivières
Former cities in Quebec
1738 establishments in the French colonial empire